The Magic House is a British children's television animation puppet show created by Joe Austen, that was broadcast on Scottish Television from 7 January 1994 to 30 July 1996. The television programme was adapted from a series of children's books written and illustrated by Austen in the early 1980s. The show's 52 10-minute episodes were aired across the ITV Network between 1994 and 1996. As well as the television episodes, a spin-off series of books was also produced, written and illustrated by Joe Austen. The show, which featured Uncle Teapot, Kitty Kettle, Barney Bin and other characters based on household items, proved a success with the characters appearing in adverts for the Trustee Savings Bank for children's savings accounts.

Characters 
 Barney Bin
 Bessy Brush
 Grandpa Clock
 HG Well
 Kitty Kettle
 PC Pot
 Soapy Bubbles
 Uncle Teapot
 Teddy Chair
 The Eggcups
 Jack Salt
 Paddy Pepper
 Sam Spade
 Waffle
 Peek, Gobble and Fluff

Production and ownership 
In 2001 the Dundee-based Austen bought back the rights to The Magic House and other shows produced by his Storyland company. Ownership of Storyland where previously in the hands of Carlton Television and Scottish Media Group in 2003.

Plans for a revival 
In 2005, a new television series, as well as various types of books for the series, were planned to be developed.

Episodes

Series 1
Moving Pictures - 7 January 1994
Air Fare - 14 January 1994
Apple Pie Bed - 21 January 1994
Ups & Downs - 28 January 1994
Down in the Dumps - 4 February 1994
Mirror Mirror - 11 February 1994
A Drop in the Bucket - 18 February 1994
Whats in the Box - 25 February 1994
Cat & Dog - 4 March 1994
Blind Mans Buff - 11 March 1994
Curious Cases - 18 March 1994
The Runaway Trees - 25 March 1994
Exercising - 1 April 1994
Sticking Together - 8 April 1994
Sound Asleep - 15 April 1994
Kind Hearts & Juicy Pies - 22 April 1994
Full Moon - 29 April 1994
Now You See Her - 6 May 1994
Big Blowout - 13 May 1994
Fast & Tight - 20 May 1994
Pig Business - 27 May 1994
Absent Friends - 3 June 1994
Ready Teddy Go - 10 June 1994
What A Balloon - 17 June 1994
Blowing Hot & Cold - 24 June 1994
Musical Chairs - 1 July 1994

Series 2
The New Arrival (A.K.A Meet Waffle) - 7 February 1995
Painting Colours - 14 February 1995
Soapy Bubble’s Little Troubles - 21 February 1995
Football on the Beach - 28 February  1995
The Waffle Cycle - 7 March 1995
Cloud Animals - 14 March 1995
Peek a Boo PC Pot - 21 March 1995
The Magic Watch - 28 March 1995
Trip to the Seaside - 27 June 1995
PC Pot’s Long Lost Relative - 4 July 1995
Barney Bin’s 5 Wishes - 11 July 1995
Food Marvellous Food - 18 July 1995
The Pantomime - 25 July 1995

Series 3
Gobble, Peek and Fluff - 2 January 1996
The New Wonder Hat - 9 January 1996
The Wishing Tree - 16 January 1996
Dreamland - 23 January 1996
Follow the Leader - 30 January 1996
Winter Wonderland - 27 February 1996
Wibbly Wobbly - 5 March 1996
Guess The Music Instruments - 12 March 1996
Toys Everywhere - 19 March 1996
X Marks The Spot - 9 July 1996
Copies - 16 July 1996
Kitty's Birthday - 23 July 1996
The Magic House Christmas Special  - 30 July 1996

UK VHS releases 
The show was released as 3 VHS tapes in the mid 90s.

References

External links 
 The Magic House page at Storyland (archive.org)
 Joe Austen, Uncle Teapot and the Foodwood, Storyland — one of the Magic House books (archive.org)
 Joe Austen, Soapy Bubbles' Little Troubles, Storyland — a preview of the book

1994 British television series debuts
1996 British television series endings
1990s British children's television series
Australian Broadcasting Corporation original programming
British television shows based on children's books
British television shows featuring puppetry
English-language television shows
ITV children's television shows
Television shows produced by Scottish Television